The 2002–03 Santosh Trophy was the 58th Santosh Trophy. It was held from 17 October up to 5 November 2002 in Imphal, Manipur.

32 teams from all over India were supposed to participate in the national state championship but three states pulled out. The final was held between hosts Manipur and defending champions Kerala, which Manipur won through a golden goal by Indian international Tomba Singh.

Qualifying rounds
Venues: Mapal Kangjeibung Stadium Main Stadium Kuman Lampak Eastern Sporting Union Ground Thangmeiband Athletic Union Ground

Cluster I

18-Oct-02: Jammu & Kashmir 4-0 Rajasthan  [3,83 Deepak Sangral, 62 Rakhesh, 87 Manat Kumar]

20-Oct-02: Bengal          7-0 Rajasthan  [14,40,73,80 Dipendu Biswas, 37 Sandip Das, 41,51 Amar Pyne]

22-Oct-02: Bengal          5-0 Jammu & Kashmir  [3,24,67 Dipendu Biswas, 64 Surya Bikash Chakraborty, 83 Anupam Sarkar]

Cluster II

18-Oct-02: Chandigarh      1-2 Meghalaya  [C: 58 Munish Kumar; M: 17 Richard Nongneng, 43 Soki Lamara]

20-Oct-02: Maharashtra     2-0 Chandigarh  [70 Naushad Moosa, 77 Aziz Quereshi]

22-Oct-02: Maharashtra     3-2 Meghalaya  [Ma: 51 Aziz Quereshi, 71 Anthony Fernandes, 78 Altafuddin Ahmed; Me: 72 Sam Kharbhi, 77 Freddy Kharpran]

Cluster III

18-Oct-02: Mizoram         2-1 Madhya Pradesh  [Mi: 10 Joseph Lalnunzira, 48 Benjamin Zonunsiama; MP: 67 Rahamat Baig]

21-Oct-02: Punjab          1-0 Madhya Pradesh  [33 Gurjit Singh Atwal]

23-Oct-02: Punjab          1-0 Mizoram  [88 Sher Singh]

Cluster IV

17-Oct-02: Manipur         8-0 Himachal Pradesh  [36,51,70,83 Bijen Singh, 43 Kanta Singh, 55 Helen Singh, 62 Tomba Singh, 86 Tiken Singh]

20-Oct-02: Pondicherry     0-1 Himachal Pradesh  [90 Rahul Sharma]

22-Oct-02: Manipur         9-0 Pondicherry   [1 Sanaton Singh, 3,44,70,87 Tiken Singh, 40,41 Bijen Singh, 50 James Singh, 72 Nilakumar Singh]

Cluster V

 Daman & Diu has pulled out

18-Oct-02: Assam           3-0 Andhra Pradesh  [36 Utpal Basumatary, 44 Kamal Chetry, 90 Padum Brpha]

21-Oct-02: Bihar           1-0 Andhra Pradesh  [58 Suresh Kalandi]

23-Oct-02: Bihar           0-3 Assam  [6 Utpal Basumatary, 58 Saran Sonar, 79 Sanjiva Rongpi]

Cluster VI

 Arunachal Pradesh has pulled out

19-Oct-02: Services        5-0 Uttar Pradesh  [26,40,45 Pritam Bahadur, 49 Bikash Gurung, 60 Thiruna Vakarsu]

21-Oct-02: Sikkim          3-0 Uttar Pradesh  [34 Milan Lepcha, 44 Kamal Bagdas, 89 Ram Rai]

23-Oct-02: Services        3-0 Sikkim  [39 Jhoney P Gangmei, 56 Pritam Bahadur, 57 Raghu Kumar]

Cluster VII

19-Oct-02: Haryana         0-1 Gujarat  [68 Mukesh Kumar]

19-Oct-02: Karnataka       4-1 Tripura  [K: 11 SK Dayanand, 68 Jagadish Kumar, 76 Sunil S Kumar, 90 BV Pradeep; T: 21 Sambhu Saha]

21-Oct-02: Tripura         4-1 Gujarat  [T: 10 Swapan Rai, 48 Sambhu Saha, 53,64 Premjit Singh Barua; G: 56 Ranjit Sisodiya]

21-Oct-02: Haryana         0-2 Karnataka  [29 SK Dayanand, 75 Gregory Clarke]

23-Oct-02: Karnataka       6-0 Gujarat  [34 Sunil S Kumar, 52,72 BV Pradeep, 62,79 SK Dayanand, 60 Kanika Raj]

23-Oct-02: Tripura         2-1 Haryana  [T: 37,77 Swapan Rai; H: 30 Satya Singh]

Cluster VIII

 Andaman Nicobar has pulled out

19-Oct-02: Orissa          0-0 Delhi

21-Oct-02: Nagaland        1-1 Delhi  [N: 90 Vizo Peseyie; D: 45 Rajesh Arya]

23-Oct-02: Orissa          3-0 Nagaland  [38,86 Gyanaranjan, 66 Bhabani Prasad Mohanty]

Quarterfinal League

Group A

Group B

Group C

Group D

Semi-finals

Final

Awards

References

External links
The official LG Santosh Trophy 2002 website: santoshtrophy2002.nic.in

2002–03 in Indian football
2002-03